The 1971 Mississippi State Bulldogs football team represented Mississippi State University as a member of the Southeastern Conference (SEC) during the 1971 NCAA University Division football season. Led by fifth year head coach Charles Shira, the Bulldogs compiled an overall record of 2–9 with a mark of 1–7 in conference play, placing last out of ten teams in the SEC. Mississippi State played three home games at Scott Field in Starkville, Mississippi and three at Mississippi Veterans Memorial Stadium in Jackson, Mississippi.

Schedule

References

Mississippi State
Mississippi State Bulldogs football seasons
Mississippi State Bulldogs football